Chortophaga is a genus of "band-winged grasshopper" of the family Acrididae.

Species
Listed alphabetically.
 Chortophaga australior Rehn & Hebard, 1911 – Southern Green-Striped Grasshopper (sometimes listed as a subspecies of C. viridifasciata)
 Chortophaga cubensis (Scudder, 1875)
 Chortophaga mendocino Rentz, 1977 – Mendocino Green-striped Grasshopper
 Chortophaga viridifasciata (De Geer, 1773) – Northern Green-striped Grasshopper

References

Acrididae genera
Oedipodinae